Repetition is the fifth studio album by the American post-hardcore band Unwound, released on April 9, 1996 by Kill Rock Stars. It was recorded in January 1996 at John and Stu's Place in Seattle, Washington and produced by Steve Fisk and John Goodmanson. The album received positive reviews from critics.

Recording and release
Repetition was recorded in January 1996 at John and Stu's Place in Seattle, Washington and produced by Steve Fisk and John Goodmanson. The band sought a more "studio-oriented" approach than their previous albums and experimented new sounds with keyboards. The word "Repetition" was chosen as the album's title because, according to singer and guitarist Justin Trosper, "I like that word. It sort of describes a lot of things. People have said that our music is repetitious. So I thought it would be funny if we called out record that. Plus it's our fifth record, so we're like repeating things over and over". Repetition was released on April 9, 1996 by the independent record label Kill Rock Stars, which also released the band's previous three albums. The song "Corpse Pose" was released as a single on March 11, 1996, featuring an outtake, "Everything Is Weird", as the B-side.

Critical reception

The album received positive reviews from music critics. AllMusic reviewer Blake Butler described Repetition as the band's "most sleek and mood-encompassing album." Megan McCarthy of CMJ New Music Monthly opined that the album features "a sound that is polished and paced, tethering its bass-driven ferocity to tingling melodies", but also admitted that some songs such as "Fingernails on a Chalkboard" are too repetitious. Matt Ashare, writing for Boston Phoenix, stated that Repetition "mixes in a dub-heavy instrumental reminiscent of early PiL ('Sensible'), a high-pitched feedback frenzy buoyed by a stark funk backbeat ('Fingernails on a Chalkboard') that recalls Gang of Four's 'Anthrax', elegant Tom Verlaine-style guitar lines, and skronk punctuated by synth noise that harks back to the heyday of Captain Beefheart ('Corpse Pose'). The likes of Rancid and Green Day pale in comparison to the challenge of Unwound: this is the real punk rock." The album has been hailed as a masterpiece among those in the punk rock scene.

Track listing

Personnel
Justin Trosper – Guitar, vocals
Sara Lund – Drums
Vernon Rumsey – Bass
Steve Fisk – Producer, additional keyboards
John Goodmanson – Engineer, co-producer
Jason Funk – Photography

References

External links 

1996 albums
Albums produced by John Goodmanson
Albums produced by Steve Fisk
Kill Rock Stars albums
Unwound albums
Hardcore punk albums by American artists